1. FC Sand is a German association football club from the town of Sand am Main, Bavaria.

History
The club was established on 27 March 1920 and first came to note with their rise to the Landesliga Bayern-Nord in 1981. The club lasted for only three seasons at this level but made an immediate return after relegation. After returning to the Landesliga in 1985, the first six seasons were a constant struggle for survival. The club greatly improved from 1991 onwards and would only finish in the bottom half of the table on one more occasion, in 2008. Nevertheless, it took the side until 2000 to achieve another promotion when they captured the title in the Landesliga and were promoted to the Bayernliga (IV) where they spent two seasons (2000–02) before returning to the Landesliga.

At the end of the 2011–12 season the club qualified directly for the newly expanded Bayernliga after finishing sixth in the Landesliga. It lasted for only one season at this level before being relegated again back to the Landesliga. After two seasons at this level the club finished runners-up in the league in 2015 and qualified for the promotion round. After two victories over SpVgg Selbitz Sand earned promotion back to the Bayernliga.

Honours
The club's honours:
 Landesliga Bayern-Nord
 Champions: 2000
 Runners-up: 2009
 Landesliga Bayern-Nordwest
 Runners-up: 2015
 Unterfranken Cup
 Winners: 2004

Recent managers
Recent managers of the club:

Recent seasons
The recent season-by-season performance of the club:

With the introduction of the Bezirksoberligas in 1988 as the new fifth tier, below the Landesligas, all leagues below dropped one tier. With the introduction of the Regionalligas in 1994 and the 3. Liga in 2008 as the new third tier, below the 2. Bundesliga, all leagues below dropped one tier. With the establishment of the Regionalliga Bayern as the new fourth tier in Bavaria in 2012 the Bayernliga was split into a northern and a southern division, the number of Landesligas expanded from three to five and the Bezirksoberligas abolished. All leagues from the Bezirksligas onward were elevated one tier.

References

External links
 Official team site  
 1. FC Sand at Weltfussball.de  
 Das deutsche Fußball-Archiv historical  German domestic league tables
 Manfreds Fussball Archiv  Tables and results from the Bavarian amateur leagues

Football clubs in Germany
Football clubs in Bavaria
Football in Lower Franconia
Association football clubs established in 1920
1920 establishments in Germany
Haßberge (district)